Events from the year 1878 in Scotland.

Incumbents

Law officers 
 Lord Advocate – William Watson
 Solicitor General for Scotland – John Macdonald

Judiciary 
 Lord President of the Court of Session and Lord Justice General – Lord Glencorse
 Lord Justice Clerk – Lord Moncreiff

Events 

 14 January – Alexander Graham Bell demonstrates the telephone to Queen Victoria.
 15 March – restoration of the Scottish hierarchy of the Roman Catholic Church, carried out on the instructions of the newly appointed Pope Leo XIII.
 31 May – the North British Railway's first Tay Bridge across the Firth of Tay is ceremonially opened, its engineer, Thomas Bouch, being made a burgess of Dundee. Designed in iron to replace a train ferry, it is the world's longest bridge at this date.
 12 December – the iron-hulled full-rigged ship Falls of Clyde is launched at Russell & Company's yard at Port Glasgow for Wright and Breakenridge's Glasgow-based Falls Line. In 1968 she will be laid up as a museum ship in Honolulu.
 Sophia Jex-Blake sets up in practice in Edinburgh as the city's first woman doctor.
 The hydropathic establishment in Moffat is opened.
 Construction of forts on Inchkeith begins.
 West coast shipping operator David Hutcheson & Co. passes wholly to control of David MacBrayne.
 The sanitary porcelainware works at Barrhead that becomes part of Armitage Shanks is established.

Births 
 20 January – Finlay Currie, actor (died 1968 in England)
 23 March – Muirhead Bone, graphic artist (died 1953 in England)
 12 April – Alex McDonald, footballer (died 1949)
 24 July – Louisa Jordan, nurse (died 1915 in Serbia)
 10 August – Louis Esson, poet and playwright (died 1943 in Australia)
 14 December – James Greenlees, rugby union footballer, educationalist and soldier (died 1951)
 Robert Freeman, Baptist minister in the United States
 George Wittet, architect (died 1926 in Bombay)

Deaths 
 26 January – Kirkpatrick Macmillan, inventor of the bicycle (born 1812)
 19 February – George Paul Chalmers, painter (born 1833; died as the result of a street attack)
 6 June – Robert Stirling, Church of Scotland minister and inventor of the Stirling engine (born 1790)
 13 August – George Gilfillan, writer and poet (born 1813)
 5 December – George Whyte-Melville, novelist and poet (born 1821)
 31 December  – James Matheson, Member of Parliament and co-founder of Jardine, Matheson & Co. (born 1796)

The arts
 July – William McGonagall journeys on foot from Dundee to Balmoral Castle over mountainous terrain and through a violent thunderstorm in a fruitless attempt to perform his verse before Queen Victoria.

See also 
 Timeline of Scottish history
 1878 in the United Kingdom

References 

 
Years of the 19th century in Scotland
Scotland
1870s in Scotland